Lilla Nagy (born 18 December 1989, in Pécs) is a Hungarian football forward currently playing in the Hungarian First Division for MTK Hungária, with whom she has also played the Champions League. She is a member of the Hungarian national team.

References

1989 births
Living people
Hungarian women's footballers
Hungary women's international footballers
MTK Hungária FC (women) players
Sportspeople from Pécs
Women's association football forwards